The 1995 Speedway Grand Prix was the 50th edition of the official World Championship to determine the world champion rider.

It was the first season in the Speedway Grand Prix era used to determine the Speedway World Champion. The Grand Prix series was won by Hans Nielsen; it was his fourth World Champion title.

Event format 

For the new Speedway Grand Prix series it remained the case at each meeting that each rider raced every other once. However, the top 4 riders qualified for a final and the points for all other riders determined their finishing position in the meeting and therefore their championship Grand Prix points. The 4 finalists scored 20, 18, 17 and 16 points, with the reminder scoring 15, 14, 13, 12, 11, 10, 9, 8, 7, 6, 4, 3, 2, 1.

Qualification for Grand Prix 
The 1995 season had 17 permanent riders (2 as track reserve) and 1 wild card at each event. Each event also could feature 2 reserves who were available to compete and qualify for full points. The 17 riders selected for the 1995 Grand Prix were the top 10 from the 1994 World final, 5 seeded through who were (Sam Ermolenko, Chris Louis, Tomasz Gollob, Gary Havelock and Andy Smith) and 2 wildcards (Billy Hamill and Mikael Karlsson).

The permanent riders are highlighted in the results table below.

1995 Event Schedule and Winners

Final standings

See also 
 motorcycle speedway

References 

 
1995
World I